The 1991–92 Iraq FA Cup was the 15th edition of the Iraq FA Cup as a clubs-only competition. The tournament was won by Al-Quwa Al-Jawiya for the second time in their history, beating Al-Tayaran (now known as Al-Khutoot Al-Jawiya) 2–1 in the final.

Bracket

Matches

Final

References

External links
 Iraqi Football Website

Iraq FA Cup
Cup